This is the discography of Macedonian-Romani and former Yugoslav singer-songwriter Esma Redžepova. This discography consists of 24 studio albums, 18 7-inch singles, 15 EPs, and 3 compilation albums. This list does not include collaboration on projects by other acts or artists.

Studio albums

Extended plays

Compilation albums

Singles

External links
Esma Redžepova discography at Discogs

Discographies of Macedonian artists
Folk music discographies